The  International Wrestling Council (IWC) World Heavyweight Championship (Campeonato Mundial de Peso Completo de la IWC in Spanish) was a professional wrestling world heavyweight championship in the Mexican professional wrestling promotion, Lucha Libre AAA Worldwide (AAA). The championship existed from 1993 until 2007, when it was unified with the GPCW SUPER-X Monster Championship, Mexican National Heavyweight Championship and UWA World Light Heavyweight Championship to create the AAA Mega Championship. The championship was generally contested in professional wrestling matches, in which participants execute scripted finishes rather than contend in direct competition.

History 
The IWC World Heavyweight Championship was created by Ron Skoler to promote the shows of AAA in the United States. In 1995, AAA and the IWC ended their partnership, and AAA founder Antonio Peña took control of and continued promoting the championship. In late of 1999, Pirata Morgan came to AAA from the International Wrestling Revolution Group (IWRG) and took with him the IWRG Intercontinental Heavyweight Championship. Morgan began to be promoted as IWC World Heavyweight Champion and the previous champion, L.A. Park began to defend the title as the "IWC World Hardcore Champion".

Reigns 
The inaugural champion was Cien Caras, who defeated Konnan at Live Event on November 13, 1993 in San Jose, California. The longest reigning champion was Cibernético who held the title for 2554 days from August 18, 2000 to August 16, 2007. The youngest champion is Cibernético who won at the age of 25 years and 128 days. The shortest reigning champion was Héctor Garza who held the title for 7 days from August 11, 2000 to August 18, 2000. Pirata Morgan has held the title the most times with 3 championship reigns. The oldest champion is Perro Aguayo who won at the age of 48 years and 299 days.

Title history

List of combined reigns

References

External links 
IWC World Heavyweight Title History

Lucha Libre AAA Worldwide championships
World heavyweight wrestling championships